Cup and saucer  may refer to:

 Cup and Saucer Creek, a storm drain located in Sydney, New South Wales, Australia
 Cup and Saucer, the high point of Manitoulin Island, in Lake Huron, Ontario, Canada
 Cup-and-saucer plant (Holmskioldia sanguinea), a plant species
 Cup-and-saucer snail (Calyptraeidae) 
 Cup and Saucer Stakes, a Canadian Thoroughbred horse race held annually in October at Woodbine Racetrack in Toronto, Ontario
 Cup and Saucer (string figure)
 Cup-and-saucer vine (Cobaea scandens), a perennial ornamental plant species native of Tropical America
 Cups and Saucers, a one-act "satirical musical sketch" written and composed by George Grossmith
 a pattern in stock market prediction